Nathan Doak (born 17 December 2001) is an Irish rugby union player who plays scrum-half for Ulster in the United Rugby Championship and the European Rugby Champions Cup.

The son of the former Ulster scrum-half and head coach Neil Doak, he was a mascot and a ball-boy at Ravenhill as a child. He started playing rugby at Wallace High School, and was part of the team that shared the Ulster Schools' Cup with The Royal School, Armagh after the final was called off due to the COVID-19 pandemic. He won the Ulster Boys' Schools Player of the Year award in 2020.

He represented Ireland at U18 and U19 level, and played for Ulster A in the 2019–20 Celtic Cup, before joining the Ulster academy for the 2020–21 season. He made his Ulster debut in Round 10 of the 2020–21 Pro14 against .

He was selected for the Ireland national under-20 rugby union team for the 2021 Six Nations Under 20s Championship. He played in the victory against Wales, scoring three penalties, three conversions and a 50-metre try; in the defeat to England, scoring a penalty and a conversion; in the win over Italy, scoring two penalties and two conversions; and in the defeat to France, scoring two conversions and three penalties.

He signed a development contract with Ulster ahead of the 2021-22 season. He impressed in the absence of John Cooney with injury, scoring 48 points in nine appearances, and was awarded a senior contract in December. He made his first Champions Cup start against Northampton Saints in January 2022, scoring a try in a 24-20 victory. He finished the season with 23 appearances and 134 points, and was nominated for Young Men's Player of the Year in the 2022 Ulster Rugby Awards. He was selected for the Emerging Ireland squad for the Toyota Challenge in South Africa in September 2022.

References

External links
Ulster Rugby profile
United Rugby Championship profile

2001 births
Living people
Irish rugby union players
Ulster Rugby players
Rugby union scrum-halves